Nicol Pitro (born 7 October 1975) is a female badminton player from Germany.

Career
Pitro competed in badminton at the 2004 Summer Olympics in mixed doubles with partner Björn Siegemund.  They defeated Travis Denney and Kate Wilson-Smith of Australia in the first round but lost to Nathan Robertson and Gail Emms of the United Kingdom in the round of 16.

References
Martin Knupp: Deutscher Badminton Almanach, Deutscher Badminton-Verband (2003), 230 pages

1975 births
Living people
German female badminton players
Badminton players at the 2000 Summer Olympics
Badminton players at the 2004 Summer Olympics
Olympic badminton players of Germany
People from Goslar
Sportspeople from Lower Saxony